The 14th People's Choice Awards, which honored the best in popular culture for 1987, were held in 1988. They were broadcast on CBS.

Winners

Favorite Female Performer in a New TV Program:
Dolly Parton

Favorite New TV Dramatic Program:
Thirtysomething

Favorite TV Dramatic Program:
L.A. Law

Favorite Young TV Performer:
Kirk Cameron,
Keshia Knight Pulliam (tie)

Favorite Female TV Performer:
Cybill Shepherd

Favorite Male Musical Performer:
Kenny Rogers

Favorite Motion Picture Actress:
Glenn Close

Favorite All-Around Male Entertainer:
Bill Cosby

Favorite Comedy Motion Picture:
Three Men and a Baby

Favorite Dramatic Motion Picture:
Fatal Attraction

Favorite Female Musical Performer:
Whitney Houston

Favorite Male Performer in a New TV Program:
John Ritter

Favorite All-Time Motion Picture Star:
Clint Eastwood

Favorite All-Time Song:
"Somewhere My Love (Lara's Theme)"

Favorite Rock Group:
Bon Jovi

Favorite TV Comedy Program:
The Cosby Show

Favorite All-Time TV Star:
Bill Cosby

Favorite All-Time Musical Star:
Barbra Streisand

Favorite Male TV Performer:
Bill Cosby

Favorite Motion Picture Actor:
Michael Douglas

Favorite All-Around Female Entertainer:
Dolly Parton

Favorite New TV Comedy Program:
A Different World,
My Two Dads (tie)

Favorite Talk Show Host:
Oprah Winfrey

References

People's Choice Awards
1987 awards
1988 in American television
1987 awards in the United States
March 1988 events in the United States